The 1969–70 Soviet Cup was the 12th edition of the Soviet Cup ice hockey tournament. 24 teams participated in the tournament, which was won by Spartak Moscow, who claimed their first title.

Participating teams

Tournament

1/16 finals

1/8 finals

Quarterfinals

Semifinals

Final

External links 
 Tournament on hockeyarchives.info
 Tournament on hockeyarchives.ru

Cup
Soviet Cup (ice hockey) seasons